This list contains all cultural property of national significance (class A) in the canton of Geneva from the 2009 Swiss Inventory of Cultural Property of National and Regional Significance. It is sorted by municipality and contains 86 individual buildings, 46 collections and 10 archaeological finds.

The geographic coordinates provided are in the Swiss coordinate system as given in the Inventory.

Avully

Avusy

Bardonnex

Carouge

Cartigny

Céligny

Chêne-Bougeries

Collonge-Bellerive

Cologny

Corsier

Dardagny

Genève

Genthod

Hermance

Jussy

Le Grand-Saconnex

Meinier

Meyrin

Onex

Plan-les-Ouates

Pregny-Chambésy

Russin

Satigny

Soral

Versoix

Veyrier

See also 
List of cultural property of regional significance in Switzerland: Geneva

References
 All entries, addresses and coordinates are from:

External links
 Swiss Inventory of Cultural Property of National and Regional Significance, 2009 edition:

PDF documents: Class B objects
Geographic information system